Antonio Nava (born 5 August 1948) is a Spanish basketball player. He competed in the men's tournament at the 1968 Summer Olympics.

References

1948 births
Living people
Spanish men's basketball players
Olympic basketball players of Spain
Basketball players at the 1968 Summer Olympics
Basketball players from Madrid